Dennis Sean Price (born June 14, 1965) is a former American football defensive back who played with the Los Angeles Raiders and New York Jets of the National Football League. He played college football at UCLA.

NFL career

Los Angeles Raiders

1988 season 

Price was drafted in the fifth round of the 1988 NFL Draft by his hometown team, the Los Angeles Raiders, with the 131st pick overall. In his first season, he played in 12 games, four of which he started. He also made two interceptions during the 1988 season for a total of 18 returning yards. However, he suffered a groin injury later in the season, which sidelined him.

1989 season 

Price switched from jersey number 38 to 20 before the 1989 season. He played in five games that season: the Raiders' first game of the season, against the San Diego Chargers, and the final four games of the season, against the Denver Broncos, Phoenix Cardinals, Seattle Seahawks, and New York Giants.

New York Jets 
After tearing his ACL, Price was traded to the New York Jets on October 15, 1990, for linebacker Alex Gordon. He appeared in 14 games with the Jets during the 1992 season and logged one interception. He was waived by the Jets in August 1993.

Personal life 
Price and his wife Letitia have two children, Sheldon and Kylie. Sheldon is currently a free agent cornerback who has previously played with the Indianapolis Colts, Baltimore Ravens, and Kansas City Chiefs.

References 

Living people

1965 births
African-American players of American football
American football defensive backs
Los Angeles Raiders players
New York Jets players
Players of American football from Los Angeles
UCLA Bruins football players